Grupo Desportivo Samora Correia is a Portuguese sports club from Samora Correia, Benavente.

The men's football team plays in the Honra AF Santarém. The team spent one season in the 1989–90 Segunda Divisão, but ended last. The subsequent stints in the Terceira Divisão lasted from 1990 to 1993 and 1994 to 2002. The team also contested the 2001–02 Taça de Portugal.

References

Football clubs in Portugal
Association football clubs established in 1975
1975 establishments in Portugal